The 2014–2015 Toyota Finance 86 Championship was the second running of the Toyota Finance 86 Championship. The championship began on 27 September 2014 at Taupo Motorsport Park and ended on 1 March 2015 at Hampton Downs Motorsport Park after eighteen races held at six meetings.

The championship was won by Ken Smith Motor Racing driver Tom Alexander, after a run of six successive wins – four overall wins plus two class wins, behind the non-scoring Nick Cassidy (Neale Motorsport) at Manfeild – at Teretonga, Manfeild and Hampton Downs. Alexander won the championship by 66 points ahead of defending champion Jamie McNee, who won races at Taupo, Pukekohe and Hampton Downs for ETEC Motorsport. Ash Blewett finished in third place in the series, 52 points in arrears of McNee and 118 of Alexander. He won four races over the course of the season, including a double at Pukekohe. The other drivers to win races were Marcus Armstrong, who won races at each of the first three race meetings, Matt Gibson won the opening race at Taupo, en route to fifth in the championship, while Cassidy won a third race at Teretonga, the only round in which he was eligible for championship points.

Teams and drivers
All teams were New-Zealand registered.

Race calendar and results
All rounds were held in New Zealand. Rounds 3, 4 and 5 were held with the Toyota Racing Series.

Championship standings
In order for a driver to score championship points, they had to complete at least 75% of the race winner's distance, and be running at the finish. All races counted towards the final championship standings.

Scoring system

References

External links
 

Toyota Finance 86 Championship
Toyota Finance 86 Championship
Toyota Finance 86 Championship